Willoughby Hamilton defeated Harry Barlow, 2–6, 6–4, 6–4, 4–6, 7–5 in the All Comers' Final, and then defeated the reigning champion William Renshaw, 6–8, 6–2, 3–6, 6–1, 6–1 in the challenge round to win the gentlemen's singles tennis title at the 1890 Wimbledon Championships.

Draw

Challenge round

All comers' finals

Top half

Bottom half

References

External links

Gentlemen's Singles
Wimbledon Championship by year – Men's singles